The 1951 Western Reserve Red Cats football team represented the Western Reserve University in the American city of Cleveland, Ohio, now known as Case Western Reserve University, during the 1951 college football season.  The Red Cats were a member of the Mid-American Conference (MAC).

The team was coached by Edward L. Finnigan and assisted by Wes Stevens.

As the new home stadium, the expanded Clarke Field officially opened October 6, 1951 against the Kent State Golden Flashes.  The new stadium had a capacity of 10,000 and the press box accommodated 100.

Schedule

References

Western Reserve
Case Western Reserve Spartans football seasons
Western Reserve Red Cats football